Mohamed Ramzi (born 22 March 1982) is a Sri Lankan former cricketer. He played in 33 first-class and 23 List A matches between 2000/01 and 2006/07. He made his Twenty20 debut on 17 August 2004, for Kurunegala Youth Cricket Club in the 2004 SLC Twenty20 Tournament.

References

External links
 

1982 births
Living people
Sri Lankan cricketers
Kurunegala Youth Cricket Club cricketers
Place of birth missing (living people)